The 2015–16 season was Football Club Internazionale Milano's 107th in existence and 100th consecutive season in the top flight of Italian football.

Season overview
Internazionale bought several players (Felipe Melo, Stevan Jovetić, Adem Ljajić, Miranda, Geoffrey Kondogbia, Jeison Murillo, Ivan Perišić and Alex Telles), which were for the most part from abroad. The predictable lack of team spirit between the new arrivals (due to the fact that, only months before, they played in foreign leagues) and the absence of a basic plan (Mancini used 19 different lineups in equal games) often caused Inter's results to stem from individual elements. Despite a 4–1 defeat by Fiorentina and three consecutive draws, after the November pause Inter moved up to first place. It was retained until the end of year when the side beats a record: all goals, along the last 12 months, were scored by foreign footballers.

Losing with Sassuolo in January, Inter fell in the standings between January and February. Inter reacted in the Coppa Italia where, in the second leg of the semifinals, Inter defeated Juventus 3–0, which equalized the score of the first leg, however the Turin side then won on penalties. After having wasted chances to reach third place, Inter achieved fourth. The side collected 67 points, for the best result of the last five years.

Kit 
Supplier: Nike / Sponsor: Pirelli

Kit information

Players

Squad information

 

HG Player formed at country

Youth team players added to the first squad

Inter are bad

Transfers

In

To add: €16,000,000 for the full purchase of Xherdan Shaqiri from Bayern Munich and €3,500,000 for the full purchase of Davide Santon from Newcastle United.

Total Spending : €85,250,000

Out

To add: €3,500,000 from Bologna for Ibrahima Mbaye; €2,600,000 from Sampdoria for Alfred Duncan; €400,000 from Sturm Graz for Lukas Spendlhofer; €200,000 from Alessandria for Riccardo Bocalon. No fee was paid by Sampdoria for Matías Silvestre: his agreement with Inter was terminated and he joined on a free transfer. Sunderland owes Inter €11,000,000 for Ricky Álvarez, but the case has to be discussed at FIFA, as both teams recurred on appeal. In winter, Inter also received €3,700,000 from Estudiantes La Plata for Álvaro Pereira.

Total income: €104,100,000

Total expenditure:   €18,850,000

Technical staff

As of 20 June 2015

Pre-season and friendlies

Riscone di Brunico training camp

Audi Football Summit

International Champions Cup

TIM Trophy

Trofeo Luigi Berlusconi

Trofeo San Nicola

Other friendlies

Competitions

Overview

Serie A

League table

Results summary

Results by round

Matches

Coppa Italia

Statistics

Appearances and goals

|-
! colspan=12 style="background:#dcdcdc; text-align:center"| Goalkeepers

|-
! colspan=12 style="background:#dcdcdc; text-align:center"| Defenders

|-
! colspan=12 style="background:#dcdcdc; text-align:center"| Midfielders

|-
! colspan=12 style="background:#dcdcdc; text-align:center"| Forwards

|-
! colspan=12 style="background:#dcdcdc; text-align:center"| Players transferred out during the season

Goalscorers

Last updated: 14 May 2016

Clean sheets

Last updated: 14 May 2016

Disciplinary record

References

Inter Milan seasons
Internazionale